Stockton Beach is located north of the Hunter River in New South Wales, Australia. Over many years Stockton Beach has been the site of numerous shipwrecks and aircraft crash sites. In World War II it was fortified against a possible attack by Imperial Japanese forces. During that time it served as a bombing and gunnery range as well as a dumping area for unused bombs by aircraft returning from training sorties. The length of the beach, its generally hard surface and numerous items of interest along the beach make it popular with four-wheel drive (4WD) enthusiasts. Four-wheel drive vehicles are permitted to drive on Stockton Beach provided the vehicles are in possession of valid permits. The beach is also popular with fishermen and several different varieties of fish may be caught.

Geography
The sand on Stockton Beach varies from hard to soft packed and changes daily with the changing winds and weather. The dunes are the largest continuous mobile sand dunes in the Southern Hemisphere.

Beach endpoint coordinates
 Southern – 
 Northern –

Worimi conservation lands

The lands consist of the  Worimi National Park,  Worimi State Conservation Area and  Worimi Regional Park. Day-to-day management of the Worimi conservation lands is undertaken by the NSW National Parks and Wildlife Service.

History

Aboriginal history

The earliest inhabitants of the Port Stephens region and particularly the land close to Port Stephens itself were the members of the Worimi Aboriginal tribe and their middens may be seen at many points along the beach. These middens, which are up to 12,000 years old, consist mainly of the remnants of pipis and whelk shells. As the beach is constantly reshaped by the winds some middens are concealed while new ones are revealed. A midden conservation area, where beach driving is not permitted due to the cultural significance of the middens, has been established on the beach.

Tin City

In the late 19th century shipwrecks on Stockton Beach were so common that two tin sheds were constructed on a part of the beach in what is now Bobs Farm near Salt Ash to hold provisions for shipwrecked sailors. During World War II the shacks were torn down to make way for an Army camp. Today, eleven of the shacks, known collectively as "Tin City", remain but no new shacks may be built, nor can existing shacks be rebuilt if they are destroyed by the elements. Tin City and the beach's sand dunes were used for several scenes in the 1979 movie Mad Max.

Wartime history

World War II resulted in fortifications against a possible amphibious assault by Imperial Japanese forces being installed along the beach. Many of these fortifications, in the form of barbed wire entanglements and concrete pyramid shaped blocks, commonly known as tank traps, may be seen along the beach. Some of the tank traps from the northern end of the beach have been removed and relocated to near the parking area at Birubi Point in Anna Bay while most from the southern end of the beach may be found outside Fort Wallace in Stockton. Some of the tank traps remain submerged and pose a hazard to swimmers.

During World War II the beach was used as a military bombing range and Air Force pilots used to regularly drop unused bombs on the beach before landing at RAAF Base Williamtown. To this day it is occasionally possible to see exposed bombs in the sand.

On 10 February 1960 a CAC CA-27 Sabre from RAAF Base Williamtown crashed on the beach after overshooting its approach. The pilot was killed. The remains of this aircraft appear from time to time.

Leigh Leigh
In 1989 Newcastle High School student and Fern Bay resident Leigh Leigh was brutally raped and murdered on a section of the beach at Stockton. The attack was so vicious that it was spoken about at length in the Parliament of New South Wales and referred to for years after the event. A play, Blackrock (written by Australian playwright Nick Enright), and also a film of the same name, were both inspired by the event.

National park
A series of campaigns by local environmental groups and activists saw parts of the area declared a National Park in 2001.

Shipwrecks

Stockton Beach has been the site of numerous shipwrecks over the past 200 years but especially since the late part of the 19th century. Wreckage from many shipwrecks continues to wash ashore periodically but the most well known, recognisable and permanent of the wrecks are the Uralla and the MV Sygna.

There was no loss of life but after the vessel was eventually refloated it drifted ashore and broke up. Its remains may be seen occasionally at low tide.

The MV Sygna was a  Norwegian bulk carrier that ran aground during a major storm on 26 May 1974. Attempts to refloat the ship were unsuccessful. The ship broke its back and the stern now lies off Stockton Beach where it is slowly decaying in the elements. The bow section was eventually towed to Taiwan and broken up. On a clear day the ship is easily visible from both ends of the beach.

Tourism
The beach is a popular camping area, at times there can be 200 camp sites with 2,000 people camped along the dunes. During the day, up to 4,000 people and thousands of cars can be on the beach.

Vehicular access

No vehicular access is possible at the southern end of the beach. Instead, all vehicles must enter the beach through the Worimi Conservation Lands in the Port Stephens local government area. Vehicle entry to the beach is via Lavis Lane in Williamtown or Gan Gan Road in Anna Bay. A permit needs to be purchased before entering the beach. Drivers must ensure that they respect the natural habitat of the beach and refrain from driving on the plants and grasses on dune structure. Access to the recreational vehicle area is subject to restrictions.

The beach is at its widest near the Lavis Lane entrance.

Sand mining
Sand mining is practised on Stockton beach. This has led to a significant loss of tertiary vegetation in the hind dunes of the beach which has led to a noticeable decrease in the numbers of native species sightings, for example the eastern grey kangaroo and sugar glider. There is considerable opposition to the controversial sand mining.

Wildlife
The waters just off Stockton Beach form part of a larger nursery for great white sharks. Humpback whales can be spotted from the beach each year during the migration season.

Big Beach Challenge
Since 2010, an annual event called the "Big Beach Challenge" is held which sees competitors travel the entire length of Stockton Beach from Birubi to Stockton Surf Club. Some of the top runners manage to cover this in under three hours, whilst those who walk the distance finish in around seven. A shorter  event from Stockton to the shipwreck of the Sygna and back is also held at the same time. The Big Beach Challenge helps raise money for local Stockton charity, Harry's House.

Gallery

References

External links
 
 Worimi Conservation Lands website

Geography of Newcastle, New South Wales
Port Stephens Council
Beaches of New South Wales
Longest beaches